In mathematics, a CM-field is a particular type of number field, so named for a close connection to the theory of complex multiplication. Another name used is  J-field.

Formal definition
A number field K is a CM-field if it is a quadratic extension K/F where the base field F is totally real but K is totally imaginary. I.e., every embedding of F into  lies entirely within , but  there is no embedding of K into .

In other words, there is a subfield F of K such that K is generated over F by a single square root of an element, say
β = ,
in such a way that the minimal polynomial of β over the rational number field  has all its roots non-real complex numbers. For this α should be chosen totally negative, so that for each embedding σ of  into the real number field,
σ(α) < 0.

Properties
One feature of a CM-field is that complex conjugation on  induces an automorphism on the field which is independent of its embedding into . In the notation given, it must change the sign of β.

A number field K is a CM-field if and only if it has a "units defect", i.e. if it contains a proper subfield F whose unit group has the same -rank as that of K . In fact, F is the totally real subfield of K mentioned above. This follows from Dirichlet's unit theorem.

Examples
 The simplest, and motivating, example of a CM-field is an imaginary quadratic field, for which the totally real subfield is just the field of rationals.
 One of the most important examples of a CM-field is the cyclotomic field , which is generated by a primitive nth root of unity.
The union QCM of all CM fields is similar to a CM field except that it has infinite degree. It is a quadratic extension of the union of all totally real fields QR. The absolute Galois group Gal(/QR) is generated (as a closed subgroup) by all elements of order 2 in Gal(/Q), and Gal(/QCM) is a subgroup of index 2. The Galois group Gal(QCM/Q) has a center generated by an element of order 2 (complex conjugation) and the quotient by its center is the group Gal(QR/Q).
If V is a complex abelian variety of dimension n, then any abelian algebra F of endomorphisms of V has rank at most 2n over Z. If it has rank 2n and V is simple then F is an order in a CM-field. Conversely any CM field arises like this from some simple complex abelian variety, unique up to isogeny.
One example of a totally imaginary field which is not CM is the number field defined by the polynomial .

References

 

 

Field (mathematics)
Algebraic number theory